The 2004 WNBA season was their sixth season and their second in Connecticut. The Sun attempted to return to the postseason for the second consecutive season and were successful.

Offseason

Dispersal Draft
Based on the Sun's 2003 record, they would pick 8th in the Cleveland Rockers dispersal draft. However, the Sun traded the pick to the Houston Comets.

WNBA Draft

Transactions
May 19: The Sun waived Courtney Colman.
May 18: The Sun waived Anna Zimerle, Ugo Oha, and Anastasia Kostaki.
May 12: The Sun waived Courtney Mix and Katie MacFarlane.
May 10: The Sun waived Brina Chaney and Brianne Stepherson.
May 4: The Sun waived Texlin Quinney, Jamila Wideman, and Isabel Stubbs.
April 26: The Sun signed Brina Chaney, Katie MacFarlane, Le'Coe Willingham, Jennifer Derevjanik, Courtney Mix, and Texlin Quinney.
April 20: The Sun waived Adrienne Johnson.
April 19: The Sun waived Jamila Wideman.
April 16: The Sun signed Isabel Stubbs.
April 9: The Sun signed Wendy Palmer-Daniel, Brianne Stepherson, Anna Zimerle, and Anastasia Kostaki.
March 25: The Sun acquired Asjha Jones from the Washington Mystics. The Washington Mystics acquired Tamicha Jackson from the Phoenix Mercury. The Phoenix Mercury acquired the 8th pick in the 2004 WNBA Draft from the Sun.
January 28: The Sun traded Shannon Johnson and their 21st and 34th picks in the 2004 WNBA Draft to the Silver Stars in exchange for San Antonio's 4th, 16th, 29th picks in the 2004 WNBA Draft.
January 5: The Sun traded the eighth pick in the 2004 WNBA Dispersal Draft to the Houston Comets in exchange for a second-round pick in the 2004 collegiate draft.

Roster

Season standings

Schedule

Preseason

|- align="center" bgcolor="ffbbbb"
| 1
|  May 8
|  Chinese National Team
| L 85-87
| Derevjanik (13)
| Coleman (9)
| 
| Mohegan Sun Arena
| 0-1
|- align="center" bgcolor="ffbbbb"
| 2
|  May 11
|  @ Houston
| L 71-84
| Douglas, Sales (13)
| Coleman (6)
| 
| Toyota Center
| 0-2
|- align="center" bgcolor="ffbbbb"
| 3
|  May 13
|  Los Angeles
| L 51-77
| Sales (12)
| McWilliams-Franklin (7)
| 
| Mohegan Sun Arena
| 0-3
|-

Regular season

|- align="center" bgcolor="ffbbbb"
| 1
|  May 22
|  Phoenix
| L 58-65
| 
| 
| 
| Mohegan Sun Arena
| 0-1
|- align="center" bgcolor="ffbbbb"
| 2
|  May 25
|  Houston
| L 57-68
| 
| 
| 
| Mohegan Sun Arena
| 0-2
|- align="center" bgcolor="bbffbb"
| 3
|  May 27
|  Los Angeles
| W 82-73
| 
| 
| 
| Mohegan Sun Arena
| 1-2
|-

|- align="center" bgcolor="bbffbb"
| 4
|  June 3
|  Charlotte
| W 71-62
| 
| 
| 
| Mohegan Sun Arena
| 2-2
|- align="center" bgcolor="bbffbb"
| 5
|  June 4
|  @ Washington
| W 72-63
| 
| 
| 
| MCI Center
| 3-2
|- align="center" bgcolor="ffbbbb"
| 6
|  June 6
|  Detroit
| L 73-74
| 
| 
| 
| Mohegan Sun Arena
| 3-3
|- align="center" bgcolor="ffbbbb"
| 7
|  June 9
|  @ Phoenix
| L 59-75
| 
| 
| 
| America West Arena
| 3-4
|- align="center" bgcolor="ffbbbb"
| 8
|  June 11
|  @ Seattle
| L 63-68
| 
| 
| 
| KeyArena
| 3-5
|- align="center" bgcolor="bbffbb"
| 9
|  June 12
|  @ Sacramento
| W 83-76
| 
| 
| 
| ARCO Arena
| 4-5
|- align="center" bgcolor="ffbbbb"
| 10
|  June 14
|  @ Los Angeles
| L 74-76 (OT)
| 
| 
| 
| Staples Center
| 4-6
|- align="center" bgcolor="ffbbbb"
| 11
|  June 18
|  Charlotte
| L 58-63 (OT)
| 
| 
| 
| Mohegan Sun Arena
| 4-7
|- align="center" bgcolor="bbffbb"
| 12
|  June 20
|  Washington
| W 75-65
| 
| 
| 
| Mohegan Sun Arena
| 5-7
|- align="center" bgcolor="bbffbb"
| 13
|  June 22
| @ Indiana
| W 63-58
| 
| 
| 
| Conseco Fieldhouse
| 6-7
|- align="center" bgcolor="bbffbb"
| 14
|  June 25
|  Detroit
| W 71-67 (OT)
| 
| 
| 
| Mohegan Sun Arena
| 7-7
|- align="center" bgcolor="bbffbb"
| 15
|  June 27
|  @ Detroit
| W 74-72
| 
| 
| 
| Palace of Auburn Hills
| 8-7
|- align="center" bgcolor="bbffbb"
| 16
|  June 30
|  Washington
| W 78-69
| 
| 
| 
| Mohegan Sun Arena
| 9-7
|-

|- align="center" bgcolor="bbffbb"
| 17
|  July 6
|  Indiana
| W 79-67
| 
| 
| 
| Mohegan Sun Arena
| 10-7
|- align="center" bgcolor="ffbbbb"
| 18
|  July 9
|  Sacramento
| L 70-85
| 
| 
| 
| Mohegan Sun Arena
| 10-8
|- align="center" bgcolor="bbffbb"
| 19
|  July 11
|  @ Indiana
| W 65-61
| 
| 
| 
| Conseco Fieldhouse
| 11-8
|- align="center" bgcolor="ffbbbb"
| 20
|  July 14
|  @ Minnesota
| L 63-66
| 
| 
| 
| Target Center
| 11-9
|- align="center" bgcolor="ffbbbb"
| 21
|  July 15
|  @ San Antonio
| L 67-78
| 
| 
| 
| SBC Center
| 11-10
|- align="center" bgcolor="ffbbbb"
| 22
|  July 17
|  @ Houston
| L 56-72
| 
| 
| 
| Toyota Center
| 11-11
|- align="center" bgcolor="bbffbb"
| 23
|  July 21
|  @ Detroit
| W 78-68
| 
| 
| 
| Palace of Auburn Hills
| 12-11
|- align="center" bgcolor="ffbbbb"
| 24
|  July 22
|  Minnesota
| L 52-68
| 
| 
| 
| Mohegan Sun Arena
| 12-12
|- align="center" bgcolor="bbffbb"
| 25
|  July 24
|  San Antonio
| W 69-55
| 
| 
| 
| Mohegan Sun Arena
| 13-12
|- align="center" bgcolor="ffbbbb"
| 26
|  July 30
|  @ Washington
| L 68-69
| 
| 
| 
| MCI Center
| 13-13
|- align="center" bgcolor="ffbbbb"
| 27
|  July 31
|  @ New York
| L 66-80
| 
| 
| 
| Madison Square Garden
| 13-14
|-

|-
| colspan="9" align="center" valign="middle" | Summer Olympic break
|- align="center" bgcolor="ffbbbb"
| 28
|  September 1
|  @ Charlotte
| L 55-62
| 
| 
| 
| Charlotte Coliseum
| 13-15
|- align="center" bgcolor="bbffbb"
| 29
|  September 3
|  New York
| W 61-43
| 
| 
| 
| Mohegan Sun Arena
| 14-15
|- align="center" bgcolor="bbffbb"
| 30
|  September 10
|  @ New York
| W 77-66
| 
| 
| 
| Madison Square Garden
| 15-15
|- align="center" bgcolor="bbffbb"
| 31
|  September 12
|  Seattle
| W 71-64
| 
| 
| 
| Mohegan Sun Arena
| 16-15
|- align="center" bgcolor="bbffbb"
| 32
|  September 15
|  @ Charlotte
| W 81-67
| 
| 
| 
| Charlotte Coliseum
| 17-15
|- align="center" bgcolor="ffbbbb"
| 33
|  September 17
|  New York
| L 66-69
| 
| 
| 
| Mohegan Sun Arena
| 17-16
|- align="center" bgcolor="bbffbb"
| 34
|  September 19
|  Indiana
| W 80-60
| 
| 
| 
| Mohegan Sun Arena
| 18-16
|-

Playoffs

In the first round of the Eastern Conference Playoffs, the Sun had to face the Washington Mystics. Since the Sun had the better record, the series would be played with game 1 at Washington, game 2 at Connecticut, and game 3 (if needed) at Connecticut. The Sun lost the first game, but won the next two to advance to the next round.
In the second round of the Eastern Conference Playoffs, the Sun had to face the New York Liberty. The Sun and the Liberty had identical records and each team had won two of the four meetings against each other in the regular season. The Sun attained home-court advantage however, because they beat the Liberty by more than the Liberty beat them. The series would be played with game 1 at New York and games 2 and 3 (if needed) at Connecticut. The Sun swept the Liberty and game 3 was not needed.
The Sun advanced to the WNBA Finals. The team would be facing off against the Seattle Storm. The Storm had the better record so the series would be played with game 1 at Connecticut, and games 2 and 3 (if needed) at Seattle. This was the last year the league played the finals in a best-of-three setup. The Storm beat the Sun 2 games to 1 to win the WNBA Finals.

|- align="center" bgcolor="ffbbbb"
| 1
|  September 25
|  @ Washington
| L 59-67
| Whalen (16)
| McWilliams-Franklin (9)
| Douglas (4)
| MCI Center13,263
| 0-1
|- align="center" bgcolor="bbffbb"
| 2
|  September 27
|  Washington
| W 80-70
| Whalen (21)
| Sales (7)
| Whalen (6)
| Mohegan Sun Arena5,760
| 1-1
|- align="center" bgcolor="bbffbb"
| 3
|  September 29
|  Washington
| W 76-56
| Sales (18)
| McWilliams-Franklin (11)
| Douglas, Whalen (6)
| Mohegan Sun Arena5,514
| 2-1
|-

|- align="center" bgcolor="bbffbb"
| 1
|  October 1
|  @ New York
| W 61-51
| Sales (15)
| McWilliams-Franklin, Palmer-Daniel (10)
| Whalen (5)
| Madison Square Garden12,146
| 1-0
|- align="center" bgcolor="bbffbb"
| 2
|  October 3
|  New York
| W 60-57
| McWilliams-Franklin (18)
| McWilliams-Franklin (9)
| Douglas (4)
| Mohegan Sun Arena6,734
| 2-0
|-

|- align="center" bgcolor="bbffbb"
| 1
|  October 8
|  Seattle
| W 68-64
| Douglas (18)
| Sales (9)
| Whalen (9)
| Mohegan Sun Arena9,518 (sellout)
| 1-0
|- align="center" bgcolor="ffbbbb"
| 2
|  October 10
|  @ Seattle
| L 65-67
| Sales (32)
| McWilliams-Franklin (7)
| Whalen (7)
| KeyArena17,072 (sellout)
| 1-1
|- align="center" bgcolor="ffbbbb"
| 3
|  October 12
|  @ Seattle
| L 60-74
| Sales (18)
| Douglas (6)
| Douglas, Whalen, McWilliams-Franklin (2)
| KeyArena17,072 (sellout)
| 1-2
|-

Depth

Player stats
http://www.wnba.com/sun/stats/2004/

Awards and honors
Taj McWilliams-Franklin, Nykesha Sales, and Lindsay Whalen were named to the WNBA All-Star team.
Nykesha Sales was named to the All-WNBA Second Team.
Wendy Palmer-Daniel was named the Most Improved Player.
Nykesha Sales was given the Off Season Community Assist Award.
Nykesha Sales was named the WNBA Player of the Week for the week of June 27, 2004.

References

External links

Connecticut Sun seasons
Connecticut
Connecticut Sun
Eastern Conference (WNBA) championship seasons